The Under-Secretary of the Presidency, officially Under-Secretary of the Presidency, Relations with the Cortes and Equality is the most senior civil servant of the Ministry of the Presidency of Spain.

The Under-Secretary is responsible for assisting the Minister in his duties to support the Prime Minister, preparing the meeting of the Council of Ministers and other governmental meetings, coordinating and directing the common services of the department, controlling the economic, human and technological resources of the Ministry, elaborating the governmental regulations, giving authorization for the use of the Coat of Arms, Flag and other symbols of the State and the competences about the ministry's gender equality and transparency.

From the Undersecretariat of the Presidency depends a major department called Technical General Secretariat-Secretariat of the Government and other minor departments.

History
It received the official name of Undersecretariat of the Presidency of the Council of Ministers and its first holder was Alejandro Shee y Saavedra. The office was maintained intact between 1865 and 1939, when the francoist government change its denomination to Undersecretariat of the Prime Minister's Office.

On July 19, 1951 the Undersecretariat was elevated to Ministry and Luis Carrero Blanco was appointed the Minister-Under Secretary of the Presidency.

Around 1974, the Undersecretariat lost its ministerial level when the Ministry of the Presidency was officially created and the first was subordinated to it.

Between 1986 and 1993 the Ministry of the Presidency was renamed Ministry of Relations with the Cortes and of the Secretariat of the Government receiving the Undersecretariat the same denomination. Between 2016 and 2018 the Under Secretary received also the competences of the Undersecretariat of Territorial Administration (current Under Secretary of Territorial Policy and Civil Service) and since 2018 it has also the competences over Relations with the Cortes and Equality. In 2020, the Ministry lost its responsibilities on equality but acquired those on democratic memory and religious freedom.

Structure
From the Under-Secretary of the Presidency depends the following bodies:

 The Technical General Secretariat-Secretariat of the Government
 The Deputy Technical General Secretariat.
 The Deputy Directorate-General for Reports and International Studies
 The Deputy Directorate-General for Publications
 The Secretariat of the Government's Office
 The Deputy Directorate-General for the Follow-up of Agreements and Provisions
 The Deputy Directorate-General for Resources and Relations with Courts
 The Technical Cabinet, as a permanent support and advisory body to the UnderSecretariat.
 The Administrative Office, which corresponds to the execution of the works and the administration, conservation, maintenance and inventory of movable and immovable property, as well as the direction and organization of the General Registry of the Ministry, of the unit of official public acts, of the Medical Cabinet and of the other services of the Department.
 The Deputy Directorate-General for Human Resources, which develops the functions of management and administration of the personnel of the central services of the Department, among which are the elaboration and processing of the relations of jobs and their modifications, the relation with the union organizations, as well as the establishment of training plans and social action and occupational risk prevention programs.
 The Budget and Economic Management Office, which is responsible for preparing the preliminary draft budget, coordinating the budget projects of public agencies, processing budget modifications and evaluating the various spending programs . Likewise, it is responsible for economic and financial management and administrative contracting.
 The Deputy Directorate-General for Information Technologies and Services, which exercises the functions of elaboration, development and execution of the strategic and operative plans in the matter of information systems and telecommunications; collaboration, advice and technical assistance in the field of information technology and telecommunications; and the management, design, development, implementation and operation of the information and telecommunications systems, guaranteeing their interoperability, safety and quality, as well as the provision and management of the equipment and the computer resources necessary for their execution.
The Coordination and Normative Quality Office, which is responsible for promoting the coordination and quality of the regulatory activity of the Government.
The Deputy Directorate-General for Religious Freedom, responsible for the powers related to religious freedom and the relations with the religions.

References

Government of Spain